Bangladesh Bank Colony High School is a secondary school in Chittagong, Bangladesh. It is situated into Bangladesh Bank Colony under Double Mooring Thana at Agrabad.

See also
 List of colleges in Chittagong

References

External links

 

Schools in Chittagong
Private schools in Bangladesh
Buildings and structures in Agrabad